Mohawk Productions is a television production company affiliated with television producer Bruce Helford. The company's logo is an ultrasound image of Aven Helford, child of Bruce Helford, as a fetus.

Productions

Former/current series

References 

Television production companies of the United States